Mesoligia is a genus of moths of the family Noctuidae.

Species
 Mesoligia algaini Wiltsihre, 1983
 Mesoligia fodinae (Oberthür, 1880)
 Mesoligia furuncula (Denis & Schiffermüller, 1775)
 Mesoligia kettlewelli Wiltshire, 1983
 Mesoligia literosa (Haworth, 1809)
 Mesoligia prolai Berio, 1974

References
Natural History Museum Lepidoptera genus database
Mesoligia at funet*Watson, L., and Dallwitz, M.J. 2003 onwards. British insects: the genera of Lepidoptera-Noctuidae. Version: 29 December 2011 Description of Mesoligia Boursin

Hadeninae